Gadomski (feminine: Gadomska, plural: Gadomscy) is a Polish surname. It may refer to:

 Jan Gadomski (1889–1966), Polish astronomer
 Stanisław Kostka Gadomski (1718–1797), Polish noble and military leader
 Witold Gadomski (born 1967), Polish fencer

See also
 

Polish-language surnames